Yushu Batang Airport  is an airport serving Yushu City in Qinghai Province, China. It is located 18 kilometers to the south of the city center, Gyêgu, at the 3,890 meters elevation about the sea level, which makes it the highest civilian airport in Qinghai Province, and one of the highest in the world.

The construction of the airport started in 2007. The first aircraft landed at the new airport on May 29, 2009, and the airport was officially opened on August 1, 2009.

Yushu Batang Airport has a 3,800 meter-long runway, and can receive A319 aircraft. The passenger terminal is designed to serve up to 80,000 passengers per year. According to the CAAC statistics,  the airport served 7,484 passengers during 2009, the first (incomplete) year of its operation.

The airport played an important role in the delivery of rescue personnel and relief supplies to the area affected by the 2010 Yushu earthquake. The facility was re-opened at noon on the day of the earthquake (Wednesday, April 14), and the first flight with personnel and supplies of the China International Earthquake Rescue Team landed there  at 8 pm the same day.

Airlines and destinations

See also
 List of airports in China
 List of the busiest airports in China
 List of highest airports

References

Airports in Qinghai
Airports established in 2009
2009 establishments in China